Flarchheim is a village and a former municipality in the Unstrut-Hainich-Kreis district of Thuringia, Germany. Since 1 January 2019, it is part of the municipality Unstrut-Hainich.

Flarchheim was the site of the Battle of Flarchheim on January 27, 1080, one of the very few times the Holy Roman Empire attempted to wage a midwinter military campaign in northern Europe.

References

Unstrut-Hainich-Kreis
Former municipalities in Thuringia